Love In Singapore may refer to:

Love in Singapore (1980 film), an Indian Malayalam film
Love in Singapore (2009 film), an Indian Malayalam film